Hill End is a village in County Durham, England. It is situated on the south side of Weardale, near Frosterley.

References

External links

Villages in County Durham
Stanhope, County Durham